Woolford may refer to:

Surnames 

 Bianca Woolford (born 1991), Australian para-cyclist
 Cyril Woolford (1927–2018), English rugby league player
 Donnell Woolford (born 1966), American professional football player
 Gary Woolford (born 1954), former professional American footballer
 Jamie Woolford (born 1974), American producer, recording engineer and songwriter
 Joe Woolford, half of Joe & Jack
 John Woolford (disambiguation)
 Julian Woolford (contemporary), British theater director and writer
 Keo Woolford (1967–2016), American actor and director
 Martyn Woolford (born 1985), English footballer
 Paul Woolford (DJ), British dance music producer and DJ
 Paul Woolford (field hockey) (born 1977), New Zealand field hockey player
 Simon Woolford (born 1975), Australian rugby league player

Placenames
 Woolford, Alberta, Canada
 Woolford, Maryland, United States

See also 
 Woolfords
 Woolford Farm
 Woolford's Water

English-language surnames